Lunularin is a dihydrostilbenoid found in common celery.  It has also been found in the roots of Hydrangea macrophylla.

A lunularic acid decarboxylase has been detected from the liverwort Conocephalum conicum. It converts lunularic acid into lunularin.

References 

Dihydrostilbenoids